Alchemilla glomerulans is a species of plants belonging to the family Rosaceae.

It is native to Europe, Western Siberia and Northern America.

References

glomerulans